Habrocestum dubium is a jumping spider species in the genus Habrocestum that lives on the Socotra Archipelago off the coast of the Yemen. The female was first described in 2002.

References

Salticidae
Fauna of Socotra
Spiders described in 2002
Spiders of Asia
Taxa named by Wanda Wesołowska